Martin Boďa (born 2 February 1997) is a Slovak professional footballer who plays for Ružomberok as a forward.

Club career

MFK Ružomberok
Boďa made his Fortuna Liga debut for Ružomberok against iClinic Sereď on 15 August 2020.

References

External links
 MFK Ružomberok official club profile
 Futbalnet profile
 
 Fortuna Liga profile

1997 births
Living people
Place of birth missing (living people)
Slovak footballers
Association football forwards
MŠK Fomat Martin players
MFK Ružomberok players
4. Liga (Slovakia) players
5. Liga players
2. Liga (Slovakia) players
3. Liga (Slovakia) players
Slovak Super Liga players